Aydoğan Çipiloğlu (born 1935) is a Turkish former footballer. He competed in the men's tournament at the 1960 Summer Olympics.

References

External links
 
 

1935 births
Living people
Turkish footballers
Olympic footballers of Turkey
Footballers at the 1960 Summer Olympics
Sportspeople from Manisa
Association football defenders
Altınordu F.K. players